Indorana is an extinct genus of lissamphibians which existed in what is now India during the Early Eocene. The type and only known species is Indorana prasadi.

The genus name comes from Latin Indo- ("India") and rana ("frog), while the species is named in honor of the Indian paleontologist Guntupalli V.R. Prasad.

References

Prehistoric frogs
Rhacophoridae
Prehistoric amphibians of Asia